Transport in Honduras refers to transport in Honduras, a country in Central America.

Railways 

 Total: 
 Narrow gauge: 
  gauge: 
  gauge

Railway links with adjacent countries 
North to south:
  El Salvador — none
  Guatemala — none in use — break-of-gauge / (?) 
  Nicaragua — none

Highways 

 Totals
 Paved: 
 Unpaved:  (2012 est.)

Double carriageway highways are slowly being developed in the main population areas in Honduras, however they are not traffic-selective and accept any kind of traffic, thus slowing the speed along them. The current ones are:

 San Pedro Sula - Puerto Cortés. Length: 
 San Pedro Sula - El Progreso. Length: 
 San Pedro Sula - Villanueva. Length: 
 Tegucigalpa ring-road. Length: 
 Tegucigalpa - Támara. Length:

Waterways 
 navigable by small craft, mainly along the Northern coast.

Ports and harbors

Atlantic Ocean 
 Puerto Cortés, pop. 44,696 hab., off San Pedro Sula
 Tela, pop. 28,335 hab.
 La Ceiba, pop. 114,584 hab.
 Puerto Castilla, off Trujillo
 Roatan, pop. 6,502 hab.

Pacific Ocean 
San Lorenzo, pop. 21,043 hab.

Other 
Puerto Lempira, pop. 4,102 hab.

Merchant marine 
 Total: 306 ships (1,000 GT or over) totaling 848,150 GT/

Ships by type (1999 est.):

Flags of convenience (1998 est.):
 North Korea owns 1 ship
 Russia, 6
 Singapore: 3
 Vietnam: 1

Airports 

 Total: 119 (1999 est.)
 Main international airports: San Pedro Sula and Comayagua.
 Other international airports: Roatan and La Ceiba

Airports with paved runways 
 Total: 12
 : 3
 : 2
 : 4
 Under : 3 (1999 est.)

Airports with unpaved runways 
 Total: 107
 : 2
 : 21
 Under : 84 (1999 est.)

References

External links